El Madher District is a district of Batna Province, Algeria.

Municipalities
The district is further divided into four municipalities.
El Madher
Aïn Yagout
Djerma
Seriana

Districts of Batna Province